General elections were held in the Cayman Islands on 19 November 1992. The result was a victory for the National Team, which won 12 of the 15 seats in the Legislative Assembly.

Results
Three of the four members of the Executive Council stood for re-election (the other retired from politics prior to the elections), but all three lost their seats.

References

Elections in the Cayman Islands
Cayman
1992 in the Cayman Islands
1992 elections in British Overseas Territories
November 1992 events in North America
Election and referendum articles with incomplete results